Object points are an approach used in software development effort estimation under some models such as COCOMO II.

Object points are a way of estimating effort size, similar to Source Lines Of Code (SLOC) or Function Points.  They are not necessarily related to objects in Object-oriented programming, the objects referred to include screens, reports, and modules of the language.  The number of raw objects and complexity of each are estimated and a weighted total Object-Point count is then computed and used to base estimates of the effort needed.

See also 
 COCOMO (Constructive Cost Model)
 Comparison of development estimation software
 Function point
 Software development effort estimation
 Software Sizing
 Source lines of code
 Use Case Points

References 

Software development